Middletown Adult Education (MAE), located in Middletown, Connecticut, provides academic programs, Even Start Program, family education, job training, workplace education, enrichment classes, counseling, and assessment services.

Early history

In 1945, Middletown Adult Education was formed as the Woodrow Wilson Veterans School to serve veterans returning from World War II. The purpose was to ensure service men and women access to the many opportunities in education, in the workplace, and in the community. In the following years, these opportunities were extended to everyone in the community who wanted to complete their education, learn a marketable job skill, or pursue a new hobby or skill. In 1953, the name of the school was officially changed to Middletown Adult High School Program. From 1946 to May 2008, over 3,000 graduates finished the program with high school diplomas, General Equivalency Diplomas, and valuable job skills to further improve their lives.

From 1946 to 1989, MAE was located at the South Congregation Church on South Main Street, Middletown. From 1989 to 1995, all programs were held at the Methodist Church. Some classes are still held at the Methodist Church but the main program then moved in 1995 to its current location at the Millennium Education Center, on the site of the old Kabachnick Department Store.

Today

Middletown Adult Education has grown to be an important regional program serving nine towns. It meets the needs of an increasing number of people of all ages and backgrounds. MAE serves the Connecticut communities of Middletown, Cromwell, East Haddam/Moodus, East Hampton, Old Saybrook, Portland, Rocky Hill, Regional District #4 (Chester, Deep River, Essex, Centerbrook, Ivoryton), Regional District #13 (Durham, Middlefield, Rockfall), and Regional District #17 (Haddam, Higganum, Killingworth), Westbrook, and the surrounding areas.

External links
 http://www.maect.org/

Middletown, Connecticut
Education in Middlesex County, Connecticut
Adult education in the United States